Hatuey, also Hatüey (died 2 February 1512) was a Taíno Cacique (chief) of the Hispaniola province of Guahaba (present-day La Gonave, Haiti). He lived from the late 15th until the early 16th century. One day Chief Hatuey and many of his fellow-men traveled from present-day La Gonave, Haiti by canoe to Cuba to warn the Indigenous people that were in Cuba about the Spaniards that were coming to Cuba. He later attained legendary status for leading a group of Natives in a fight against the invasion of the Spaniards, thus becoming one of the first fighters against colonialism in the New World. He is celebrated as "Cuba's First National Hero." The 2010 film Even the Rain includes a cinematic account of Hatuey's execution.

Life and death
In 1511, Diego Velázquez set out from Hispaniola to conquer what is now known as the island of Cuba and subjugate Cuba's indigenous people, the Taíno,  who had previously been recorded by Christopher Columbus. Velázquez was preceded, however, by Hatuey, who fled Hispaniola with a party of four hundred in canoes and warned some of the Native people of eastern Cuba about what to expect from the Spaniards.

Bartolomé de Las Casas later attributed the following speech to Hatuey which was addressed against Christianity. He showed the Taíno of Caobana a basket of gold and jewels, saying:
Here is the God the Spaniards worship. For these they fight and kill; for these they persecute us and that is why we have to throw them into the sea... They tell us, these tyrants, that they adore a God of peace and equality, and yet they usurp our land and make us their slaves. They speak to us of an immortal soul and of their eternal rewards and punishments, and yet they rob our belongings, seduce our women, violate our daughters. Incapable of matching us in valor, these cowards cover themselves with iron that our weapons cannot break...

The Taíno chiefs in Cuba did not respond to Hatuey's message, and few joined him to fight. Hatuey resorted to guerrilla tactics against the Spaniards, and was able to confine them for a time. He and his fighters were able to kill at least eight Spanish soldiers. Eventually, using mastiffs and torturing the Native people for information, the Spaniards succeeded in capturing him. On 2 February 1512, he was tied to a stake and burned alive at Yara, near the present-day city of Bayamo.

Before he was burned, a priest asked Hatuey if he would accept Jesus and go to heaven. Las Casas recalled the reaction of the chief:
[Hatuey], thinking a little, asked the religious man if Spaniards went to heaven. The religious man answered yes... The chief then said without further thought that he did not want to go there but to hell so as not to be where they were and where he would not see such cruel people. This is the name and honour that God and our faith have earned.

Legacy
The town of Hatuey, located south of Sibanicú in the Camagüey Province of Cuba, was named after the Taíno hero.

Hatuey also lives on in as a beer brand name. Beer has been brewed in Santiago de Cuba and sold under the Hatuey brand name since 1927, initially by the native Cuban company, Compañia Ron Bacardi S.A.  After nationalization of industry in 1960, brewing was taken over by Empresa Cerveceria Hatuey Santiago. Beginning in 2011, the Bacardi family again began making beers in the United States to market under the Hatuey label.    
Hatuey is also a brand of a type of sugary, non-alcoholic malt beverage called Malta.  Hatuey is also a Dominican brand of soda cracker.

In a 2010 film shot in Bolivia, Even the Rain, Hatuey is a main character in the film-within-the-film.

The logo of the Cuban cigar and cigarette brand Cohiba is a picture of Hatuey.

Fine arts 
The imagery of Hatuey has been appropriated and/or incorporated into diverse artistic genres, most notably into the Afro-Cuban Yiddish Opera, "Hatuey: Memory of Fire". In the visual arts, multiple artists have used the Taíno chief's image, most notably Cuban-American artist Ric Garcia, U.S. Marine Corps artist Donald Dickson, and Australian artist damefine, among others.

See also
List of Taínos
Taíno people

References

External links 

 

15th-century births
1512 deaths
History of Hispaniola
History of the Dominican Republic 
Pagan martyrs
People executed by Spain by burning
People executed for refusing to convert to Christianity
Taíno leaders
Place of birth unknown
Year of birth unknown